Southminster railway station is the eastern terminus of the Crouch Valley Line in Essex, England, serving the town of Southminster and other settlements on the Dengie Peninsula. It is  down the line from London Liverpool Street. The station is managed by Greater Anglia who operate all services. The Engineer's Line Reference for the line is WIS, the station's three-letter station code is SMN. The platform has an operational length for 8 carriages.

The line and station were opened on 1 June 1889 for goods and on 1 October 1889 for passengers by the Great Eastern Railway in 1889. The station had a single platform and station buildings. There were extensive sidings including a line to gravel pits which operated until 3 November 1979. The sidings included a goods shed, cattle pens and a locomotive turntable.

The station was host to a LNER camping coach from 1935 to 1939 and possibly one for some of 1934.  The goods yard closed on 4 October 1965. There was a 36-lever signal box which closed on 19 January 1986. The line and station were passed to the London and North Eastern Railway following the Grouping of 1923. It then passed to the Eastern Region of British Railways upon nationalisation in 1948. The Wickford to Southminster line was electrified using 25 kV overhead line electrification (OLE) on 12 May 1986. When sectorisation was introduced, Southminster was served by Network SouthEast until the privatisation of British Rail.

Services
On Sundays, the service is reduced is to hourly.

References

External links

History of the Crouch Valley Line
Local information about Crouch Valley Line

Railway stations in Essex
DfT Category F1 stations
Former Great Eastern Railway stations
Greater Anglia franchise railway stations
Railway stations in Great Britain opened in 1889
William Neville Ashbee railway stations
Southminster